Emma Margaret Sampson (born 29 July 1985) is an Australian former cricketer who played as a right-arm pace bowler, and was considered one of the fastest in the women's game during her career, bowling at about . She appeared in one Test match, 30 One Day Internationals and five Twenty20 Internationals for Australia between 2007 and 2009. She played domestic cricket for South Australia and Surrey.

After the 2009 World Cup, Sampson announced her "shock" retirement from cricket, at the age of 23. Her best international bowling figures came in a One Day International against New Zealand in 2008, where she took 5/30. Sampson did play again for Surrey after her announcement, in the 2009 Women's Twenty20 Cup and 2009 Women's County Championship, but did not play again after the 2009 season.

Sampson was the 154th woman to play Test cricket for Australia, and the 108th woman to play One Day International cricket for Australia.

References

External links
 
 

1985 births
Living people
Cricketers from Adelaide
Australia women Test cricketers
Australia women One Day International cricketers
Australia women Twenty20 International cricketers
South Australian Scorpions cricketers
Surrey women cricketers